Johnny or Johnnie Morris may refer to:

Johnnie Morris (actor) (1887–1969), American comedian and actor
Johnny Morris (television presenter) (1916–1999), British television presenter
Johnny Morris (footballer) (1923–2011), English footballer
Johnny Morris (American football) (born 1935), American football player
Johnny Morris (businessman) (born 1948), American businessman
Johnnie E. Morris-Tatum (born 1951), American politician from Milwaukee, also known as Johnnie Morris

See also
Jonathan Morris (disambiguation)
John Morris (disambiguation)